Nqobile Nzuza was a resident in the Marikana Land Occupation in Cato Crest, which is part of Cato Manor in Durban, South Africa. She was a member of the shackdwellers' movement Abahlali baseMjondolo.

Death

On 30 September 2013, at the age of 17 years, Ms. Nzuza was shot dead in the back of her head during an anti-eviction protest organised by Marikana residents. She was the third member of Abahlali baseMjondolo killed that year.   The Independent Police Investigative Directorate (IPID) later opened a case of murder against the Cato Manor police.<ref>Poverty, inequality and violence : a case study of Cato Manor, Rachel Gray and Brij Maharaj, ISRC', 2017</ref>

Police admitted to shooting Nzuza, and another resident who was wounded, but claimed they were acting in self-defence. Representatives of Abahlali baseMjondolo said it was the fault of the police.

Aftermath

The death caused significant controversy. When Bandile Mdlalose visited Nzuza's family, she was arrested. There were a range of letters and statements on the matter by well-known US based academics such as Noam Chomsky and Anglican Bishop Rubin Phillip.

Chomsky wrote a letter to the Mail & Guardian'' newspaper in Johannesburg along with other signatories, which included Slavoj Zizek, Judith Butler and John Holloway. They urged Jacob Zuma, President of South Africa and James Nxumalo, the local Mayor to put an end to the violent attacks on activists and their homes.

Conviction

In 2018 a Cato Manor police officer, Phumlani Ndlovu, was convicted of murder and was sentenced to ten years in prison. The trial lasted 5 years. Nzuza's family declared themselves unhappy with the verdict.

See also

 Nkululeko Gwala
 Political repression in post-apartheid South Africa
 Protests in South Africa

References

2013 in South Africa
Nzuza, Nqobile
Housing in South Africa
Nzuza, Nqobile
Nzuza, Nqobile
Nzuza, Nqobile
Nzuza, Nqobile
Nzuza, Nqobile
Nzuza, Nqobile
History of Durban